Daniel P. Jacobson (born October 29, 1961) is an American politician who served in the New Jersey General Assembly from the 11th Legislative District from 1990 to 1992.

References

1961 births
Living people
Democratic Party members of the New Jersey General Assembly
People from Long Branch, New Jersey
Politicians from Monmouth County, New Jersey